Quentin "Butter" Jackson (January 13, 1909 – October 2, 1976) was an American jazz trombonist.

Career 
In the early stage of his career, Jackson worked with Cab Calloway for eight years. Later, he was a member of the Duke Ellington Orchestra and worked with Charles Mingus, Kenny Burrell, and others.

On her album Dinah Sings Bessie Smith, Dinah Washington recorded a version of Bessie Smith's "Trombone Cholly" with Jackson on the horn, under the revised title, "Trombone Butter".

Discography

With Louis Armstrong
Louis Armstrong and His Friends (Flying Dutchman/Amsterdam, 1970)
With Dorothy Ashby
The Fantastic Jazz Harp of Dorothy Ashby (Atlantic, 1965)
With Count Basie
Basie at Birdland (Roulette, 1961)
The Legend (Roulette, 1961)
Back with Basie (Roulette, 1962)
Basie in Sweden (Roulette, 1962)
With Kenny Burrell 
 Blues - The Common Ground (Verve, 1967–68)
 Ellington Is Forever Volume Two (Fantasy, 1975)
With Duke Ellington
 The 1953 Pasadena Concert  (GNP Crescendo) 
 Ellington '55  (Capitol) 
 Ellington at Newport (Columbia 1956)
 All Star Road Band (Doctor Jazz, 1957 [1983])
 Newport 1958 (Columbia 1958)
Blues in Orbit (Columbia)
Anatomy of a Murder (Columbia, 1959)
With Ella Fitzgerald
 Ella Fitzgerald Sings the Duke Ellington Songbook (Verve, 1957)
With Johnny Hodges
Ellingtonia '56 (Norgran, 1956)
Duke's in Bed (Verve, 1956)
The Big Sound (Verve, 1957)
 Johnny Hodges with Billy Strayhorn and the Orchestra (Verve, 1961)
3 Shades of Blue (Flying Dutchman, 1970)
With Milt Jackson
For Someone I Love (Riverside, 1963)
With Quincy Jones
I Dig Dancers (Mercury, 1960)
 Quincy Jones Plays Hip Hits (Mercury, 1963)
Quincy Jones Explores the Music of Henry Mancini (Mercury, 1964)
 Golden Boy (Mercury, 1964)
Quincy Plays for Pussycats (Mercury, 1959-65 [1965])
With Herbie Mann
Latin Mann (Columbia, 1965)
Our Mann Flute (Atlantic, 1966)
With Freddie McCoy
Listen Here (Prestige, 1968)
With Charles Mingus
The Complete Town Hall Concert (Blue Note, 1962 [1994])
 The Black Saint and the Sinner Lady (Impulse!, 1963)
 Mingus Mingus Mingus Mingus Mingus (Impulse!, 1963)
Epitaph (Columbia, 1989)
With Wes Montgomery 
 Movin' Wes (Verve, 1963/1997)
With Shirley Scott
 For Members Only (1963)
 Great Scott!! (1964)
Roll 'Em: Shirley Scott Plays the Big Bands (Impulse!, 1966)
With Jimmy Smith
 Hoochie Coochie Man (Verve, 1966)
 Peter & The Wolf (Verve, 1966)
With Clark Terry
Duke with a Difference (Riverside, 1957)
With Dinah Washington
 The Swingin' Miss "D" (1956)
 Blue Gardenia
 Dinah Sings Bessie Smith (1956–57)
With Billy Strayhorn
Cue for Saxophone (Felsted, 1959)
With Randy Weston
Uhuru Afrika (Roulette, 1960)
Highlife (Colpix, 1963)

References

External links
[ AllMusic]
Quentin "Butter" Jackson papers and artifacts, Institute of Jazz Studies, Rutgers University

1909 births
1976 deaths
Duke Ellington Orchestra members
American jazz trombonists
Male trombonists
Musicians from Springfield, Ohio
20th-century American musicians
20th-century trombonists
American male jazz musicians
The Thad Jones/Mel Lewis Orchestra members
McKinney's Cotton Pickers members
The Cab Calloway Orchestra members
20th-century American male musicians

People from Springfield, Ohio
People from Clark County, Ohio